Vereya is the name of several inhabited localities in Russia.

Urban localities
Vereya, Naro-Fominsky District, Moscow Oblast, a town in Naro-Fominsky District of Moscow Oblast

Rural localities
Vereya, Orekhovo-Zuyevsky District, Moscow Oblast, a settlement in Vereyskoye Rural Settlement of Orekhovo-Zuyevsky District in Moscow Oblast
Vereya, Ramensky District, Moscow Oblast, a village in Vereyskoye Rural Settlement of Ramensky District in Moscow Oblast
Vereya, Ryazan Oblast, a village in Oskinsky Rural Okrug of Klepikovsky District in Ryazan Oblast
Vereya, Zabaykalsky Krai, a settlement in Priargunsky District of Zabaykalsky Krai